John Gunnard "Jack, Jake" Hendrickson (December 5, 1936 - June 27, 2016) was a Canadian ice hockey player who played 5 games in the National Hockey League with the Detroit Red Wings between 1957 and 1962. The rest of his career, which lasted from 1957 to 1971, was spent in various minor leagues.

Career 
Hendrickson was born in Kingston, Ontario. In 2004, he was inducted as a player into the Midland, Ontario Sports Hall of Fame. He had previously been inducted twice; first in 1996, as a member of the Midland team that won the 1958 Ontario Baseball Association Intermediate 'A' championship  and second, in 1998, as a member of the 1953-54 Midland Red Wings hockey team. Hendrickson starred on defence when this team, coached by Hockey Hall of Famer Roy Conacher, won the Ontario Hockey Association Junior C championship.

Hendrickson played professional hockey from 1954-55 through the 1970-71 season. He played a total of five games in the National Hockey League with the Detroit Red Wings. He also played in the American Hockey League, the Eastern Professional Hockey League, the Western Hockey League, the Central Professional Hockey League, the International Hockey League, and the Eastern Hockey League.

Career statistics

Regular season and playoffs

References

External links 
 

1936 births
2016 deaths
Calgary Stampeders (ice hockey) players
Canadian ice hockey defencemen
Des Moines Oak Leafs players
Detroit Red Wings players
Edmonton Flyers (WHL) players
Fort Wayne Komets players
Hamilton Tiger Cubs players
Hershey Bears players
Ice hockey people from Ontario
Long Island Ducks (ice hockey) players
Los Angeles Blades (WHL) players
Port Huron Flags players
St. Louis Braves players
Seattle Totems (WHL) players
Sportspeople from Kingston, Ontario
Springfield Indians players
Sudbury Wolves (EPHL) players
Western International Hockey League players